Eloisa Cianni  (born 21 June 1932) is an Italian actress, model and beauty pageant winner.

Ciani was born in Rome as Aloisa Stukin, with the surname derived from her Polish adoptive father Stanislaus Stukin, who had married her mother Ida Furnace.

In 1952 she won the Miss Italia beauty contest, and one year later she was elected Miss Europe.

She subsequently started a career as model and actress, debuting in the Gianni Franciolini's 1953 comedy film Villa Borghese.

References

External links 

1932 births
Living people
Actresses from Rome
Italian film actresses
20th-century Italian actresses
Italian beauty pageant winners
Italian female models
Miss Europe winners
Models from Rome